Samut Sakhon City Football Club (Thai: สโมสรฟุตบอลสมุทรสาคร ซิตี้) is a Thai professional football club based in Samut Sakhon Province, Founded in 2022, the club competes in Thai League 3.

History
The club was founded in 2022

Stadium and locations

Season by season record

Players

First-team squad

Club staff

Honours

Domestic leagues
Thailand Amateur League

• Bangkok Metropolitan Region

Champions (1): 2022

References

External links
 Samut Sakhon City F.C. Official Facebook

Association football clubs established in 2010
Football clubs in Thailand
Samut Sakhon province
2010 establishments in Thailand